Nocatee Parkway is a  freeway in the southeasternmost point in Jacksonville, in the community of Nocatee, and in the counties of Duval and St. Johns. The road provides easy access to Jacksonville, Interstate 95 (I-95) and State Route 9B (Future I-795) for residents of Nocatee and elsewhere. The parkway is also critical for hurricane evacuation route for Beaches-area residents. The entire parkway is part of County Road 210 (CR 210).

Route description
The route begins at U.S. Route 1 (US 1), with short stub roads near the exit and entrance points. The parkway travels in an east to northeastward direction from US 1, with a partial cloverleaf interchange at Valley Ridge Road followed by a single-point urban interchange at Crosswater Parkway. Finally, the parkway has an intersection with Davis Park Road, ending the freeway, and becoming Palm Valley Road.

History
The construction of this parkway began in January 2008, with a cost of $150 million. The construction included clearing and grubbing, storm drainage, construction of single and double barrel box culverts, the construction of 8 bridges, transmission/distribution utility installations, drilled shaft construction, MSE wall, installation of concrete curb, sidewalk, medians, signalization, striping, and sodding. In October 2010, the parkway was completed, a decade ahead of schedule.

Exit list
All exits are unnumbered.

References

External links

County roads in Duval County, Florida
County roads in St. Johns County, Florida
Roads in Jacksonville, Florida